Victoria Lynn Shaw (born July 13, 1962) is an American country singer. She has recorded four studio albums, and has charted five singles on the Billboard Hot Country Singles & Tracks charts. In addition, she has co-written four Number One singles for other country music artists, including Garth Brooks' "The River" as featured on the multi-million selling album Ropin' The Wind and John Michael Montgomery's "I Love the Way You Love Me", which won the 1993 Academy of Country Music award for Song of the Year. With Paul Worley, she is also the co-producer of the debut album of Lady A.

Biography 
Shaw was born in Manhattan, New York City, on July 13, 1962. Inspired by country rock musicians such as the Eagles and Linda Ronstadt, she began writing songs at an early age. Later, she and her sister, Lori Shaw, found work performing together in the Los Angeles area. Shaw's mother, Carole Bergenthal, recorded for Capitol Records as Carole Bennett. The Shaws moved to California when Shaw was about five years old. Her mother, who was Jewish, would sing Yiddish lullabies to her. By age thirteen, Shaw had founded a band called Solace, which performed at weddings and bar mitzvahs.

Eventually, Shaw moved to Nashville, Tennessee, where she found a publishing contract and a record deal. A minor single, "Break My Heart", was released in 1984 on the MPB label, peaking at No. 61 on the Hot Country Songs charts. Her first major hit as a songwriter came in 1992, when she co-wrote with Garth Brooks "The River" which Brooks took to No. 1 on the Billboard country singles chart. A year later, Doug Stone reached No. 1 on the country charts with Shaw's "Too Busy Being in Love". Later that same year, another Shaw-penned song — John Michael Montgomery's "I Love the Way You Love Me" — also reached No. 1 the country charts and won an Academy of Country Music award for Song of the Year.

In 1994, Shaw signed to Reprise Records, releasing her debut album In Full View that year. Three of this album's singles — "Cry Wolf", "Tears Dry" and "Forgiveness" — all reached the lower regions of the Hot Country Songs charts. That same year, Brooks reached Number One with the song "She's Every Woman" which the two wrote together. In 1995, Shaw received a Top New Female Vocalist nomination from the Academy of Country Music, losing to Chely Wright.

Shaw's second album for Reprise, Victoria Shaw, was released in 1997. However, it produced no chart singles. In 1998, Shaw collaborated with Brooks, Billy Dean, Faith Hill, Olivia Newton-John, Neal McCoy, Michael McDonald and Bryan White for a charity single (written for the Cystic Fibrosis Foundation) entitled "One Heart at a Time", which charted at No. 56 on the Billboard Hot 100. Also that year, Trisha Yearwood recorded the song "Where Your Road Leads", which Shaw co-wrote and originally recorded on In Full View. Yearwood's rendition of the song, which was recorded as a duet with Brooks, served as the title track to her 1998 album Where Your Road Leads, from which it was released as a single.

After exiting Reprise in 1998, Shaw released her third album, Old Friends, New Memories, in 2001 on the Taffeta label. This album included her renditions of the songs that she had written for other artists. In the mid-2000s, Shaw returned to songwriting as well. She has won two Daytime Emmy Awards, in both 1999 and 2000, for co-writing songs for the daytime dramas One Life to Live and As the World Turns. Two of her songs, Emerson Drive's "A Good Man" and Eric Church's "Two Pink Lines", both charted in 2006. She and Paul Worley co-produced Lady A's self-titled debut album, which was released in April 2008. Later that same year, Shaw released her fourth album, Bring On the Love. Shaw also produced Jessie Farrell's second album, Good, Bad & Pretty Things, which was released in Canada in October 2009. In addition, she co-wrote Sarah Buxton's "Outside My Window."

As part of the show Property Brothers: At Home on the Ranch, show hosts Drew and Jonathan Scott—along with Victoria Shaw and Chad Carlson—wrote and recorded two country singles that premiered during the third and fourth episode of the series.

Discography

Studio albums

Singles

Guest singles

Other charted songs

Music videos

References

External links 
Official website

American women country singers
American country singer-songwriters
1962 births
Jewish American musicians
Living people
People from Manhattan
Singer-songwriters from New York (state)
Reprise Records artists
Country musicians from New York (state)
21st-century American Jews
21st-century American women